Jack J. Hayes (February 8, 1919 – August 24, 2011) was an American composer and orchestrator. He was twice nominated for an Academy Award, for The Unsinkable Molly Brown in 1964 and for The Color Purple in 1985.

References

External links

1919 births
2011 deaths
American film score composers
American male film score composers